Shahnaz Wazir Ali is a Pakistani politician who served as member of the National Assembly of Pakistan from 2008 to 2013.

Political career

She was elected to the National Assembly of Pakistan as a candidate of Pakistan Peoples Party on a seat reserved for women from Punjab in the 2008 Pakistani general election. She was inducted into the federal cabinet of Prime Minister Yousaf Raza Gillani and was made  Adviser to the Prime Minister on Social Sector.

In 2012, she was appointed as a special assistant to Prime Minister Raja Pervaiz Ashraf with the status of minister of state.

References

Living people
Pakistan People's Party politicians
Year of birth missing (living people)
Pakistani MNAs 2008–2013
Women members of the National Assembly of Pakistan
St Joseph's Convent School, Karachi alumni
21st-century Pakistani women politicians